{{DISPLAYTITLE:C33H34N4O6}}
The molecular formula C33H34N4O6 (molar mass : 582.64 g/mol) may refer to :
 Azelnidipine, a dihydropyridine calcium channel blocker
 Biliverdin, a green tetrapyrrolic bile pigment and a product of heme catabolism

Molecular formulas